Tom Donald Fike Bevill (March 27, 1921 – March 28, 2005) was an American attorney, politician, and Democratic fifteen-term U.S. congressman who represented Alabama's 4th Congressional District and Alabama's 7th congressional district from 1967 to 1997.

Early years and education
Bevill was born in Townley, Alabama, on March 27, 1921. He attended Walker County High School, the University of Alabama School of Commerce and Business Administration, and the University of Alabama School of Law. Bevill was an initiate of the Gamma Alpha chapter of Pi Kappa Alpha at UA. He served in the United States Army during World War II. He also privately practiced law.

Political career
In 1958, Bevill was elected to the Alabama Legislature, serving there until his election to Congress in 1966. In Congress, Bevill was known for securing federal money and development projects for his district.  This earned him the nickname "The King of Pork", a term which he actually turned into a positive. After fifteen terms in Congress, he retired in 1997.  Bevill is credited with answering the world's very first 9-1-1 emergency call on February 16, 1968, made from Haleyville by then-Alabama House Speaker Rankin Fite. He also sponsored the Bevill Amendment to the Resource Conservation and Recovery Act which excludes mining wastes from the act's jurisdiction.

Personal life
Bevill died on March 28, 2005, in Jasper, Alabama, the day after his 84th birthday. He had been in declining health for several years due to heart problems.

His son Don Bevill ran for his old seat in 1998. He lost 56%-44% to his father's Republican successor Robert Aderholt.

References

External links

 

1921 births
2005 deaths
Democratic Party members of the Alabama House of Representatives
Alabama lawyers
People from Walker County, Alabama
United States Army personnel of World War II
United States Army soldiers
University of Alabama alumni
Democratic Party members of the United States House of Representatives from Alabama
20th-century American politicians
20th-century American lawyers